Klonoa Beach Volleyball, known in Japan as , is a sports video game developed by Namco and released for PlayStation. It is a spin-off of the Klonoa game series. Its release was limited to Japan and Europe (with the characters speaking in English in the latter).

This is one of the only Klonoa titles to feature a multiplayer mode, allowing up to four players to compete in pairs against the other team using a multitap.

Reception
Super GamePower gave it a score of 9.5/10.   

Consoles+ gave it 80% score.

References

External links
 

2002 video games
Beach volleyball video games
Klonoa
Namco games
PlayStation (console) games
PlayStation (console)-only games
Multiplayer and single-player video games
Video games developed in Japan